Mejtaš is a neighbourhood of Bosnia and Herzegovina's capital Sarajevo, where it is located in the center of the city. The neighbourhood has some of the most expensive real estate properties in Sarajevo and it is one of the most prestigious parts in Sarajevo. It is also a residence of the former Chairman of the Council of Ministers of Bosnia and Herzegovina, Denis Zvizdić. The Federal Ministry of Finance and the Intelligence-Security Agency of Bosnia and Herzegovina are located in Mejtaš. The headquarters of the Party of Democratic Action, the country's most powerful political party, is located in Mejtaš. The area is also very close to "Vječna vatra" one of Sarajevo's main symbols. The neighborhoods houses the Black party of Sarajevo

Neighbourhoods in Grad Sarajevo
Centar, Sarajevo
Populated places in the Sarajevo Canton